Anderson, also known as Anderson Crossroad or Anderson Crossing, is an unincorporated community in Etowah County, Alabama, United States, located  northeast of Gadsden on U.S. Route 411. Although its boundaries aren't explicitly defined, as of 2010, it is located partly within the CDP (census-designated place) of Tidmore Bend near the northeastern boundary of the adjacent CDP of Coats Bend.

Demographics
According to the returns from 1850-2010 for Alabama, it has never reported a population figure separately on the U.S. Census.

References

Unincorporated communities in Etowah County, Alabama
Unincorporated communities in Alabama